Philip Davis Uzee (November 5, 1914 -  April 1, 2010) was a professor, dean,  university archivist, and author in the United States. He was a professor of economics and history at Nicholls State University from 1953 to the 1970s when he became the university's archivst until his retirement in 1984.

He served as an officer in the U.S. Army during World War II.

He served as president of the Louisiana Historical Association in 1970 and in 1992 was elected a fellow. He married Yvonne Toups and they had a son David of Dallas; a daughter Denise of Baton Rouge and a daughter-in-law Trina as well as grandchildren. He was inducted into the Tri-Parish Hall of Fame in 2006.

Bibliography
"The first Louisiana state constitution : a study of its origin", Master's dissertation (1938)
"Republican politics in Louisiana, 1877-1900", Ph.D. dissertation, Louisiana State University, Baton Rouge (1950)
"Midwestern attitudes on the "Kansas Fever"", historical society article
Records and recollections of Thibodaux, Louisiana with William Littlejohn Martin, Woman's Club of Thibodaux (1972)
Thibodaux Chronicles : a sesquicentennial history, a selection  of Uzee's columns from the Thibodaux Daily Comet (1987)
The Lafourche country : the people and the land, Center for Louisiana Studies, University of Southwestern Louisiana, genealogy (1985)

References

1914 births
2010 deaths
Heads of universities and colleges in the United States
20th-century American historians
20th-century American economists
Nicholls State University faculty
American university and college faculty deans
United States Army personnel of World War II
Historians from Louisiana
American archivists
Economists from Louisiana